The 2013 GP Miguel Induráin was the 60th edition of the GP Miguel Induráin cycle race and was held on 30 March 2013. The race started and finished in Estella. The race was won by Simon Špilak.

General classification

References

2013
2013 UCI Europe Tour
2013 in Spanish road cycling